Kamni Vrh pri Ambrusu is a small settlement on a hill north of Ambrus in the Municipality of Ivančna Gorica in central Slovenia. The area is part of the historical region of Lower Carniola. The municipality is now included in the Central Slovenia Statistical Region. 

The local church, built on the hill known as Stražarjev vrh north of the settlement, is dedicated to Saint Peter and belongs to the Parish of Ambrus. It dates to the mid-15th century.

References

External links
Kamni Vrh pri Ambrusu on Geopedia

Populated places in the Municipality of Ivančna Gorica